Moffett's Creek Schoolhouse is a historic public school building located near Newport, Augusta County, Virginia. It was built in 1873, as a two-room, frame schoolhouse. It sits on a fieldstone foundation and has a gable roof.  An addition was built in the 1880s, creating an "L"-shaped plan.  The school closed in 1923, and the property was sold to the Mt. Hermon Lutheran Church.

It was listed on the National Register of Historic Places in 1985.

References

School buildings on the National Register of Historic Places in Virginia
School buildings completed in 1873
Schools in Augusta County, Virginia
National Register of Historic Places in Augusta County, Virginia